Noui Laïfa (born 23 July 1986 in Les Ulis) is a French football player. He plays as a defensive midfielder often playing in a withdrawn position as a deep-lying playmaker. Laïfa joined Créteil from amateur rivals and Championnat de France amateur club UJA Alfortville and signed a one-year contract with a club option for a second year.

Laïfa began his career in Évry-Grégy-sur-Yerre, a commune in the Île-de-France region, playing for local club AS Évry. He later had stints at CSF Brétigny, the same club that produced French internationals Patrice Evra and Jimmy Briand, CS Louhans-Cuiseaux, and US Palaiseau before finally settling down at hometown club CO Les Ulis. At Les Ulis, Laïfa appeared with the under-19 team that reached the Round of 32 in the Coupe Gambardella in 2005. With the senior team of Les Ulis, he played on teams in the Division d'Excellence and Promotion d'Honneur of the Île-de-France. In 2008, Laïfa joined Championnat de France amateur club Sainte-Geneviève Sports and had a solid season appearing in 21 league matches scoring two goals. The club, however, finished last in their division thus being relegated to the fifth division. Laïfa remained in the fourth division the following season signing with UJA Alfortville. He appeared in 35 matches with the club scoring two goals. Following the season, Laïfa signed with Créteil.

After his first season as a professional player with Ajaccio, Laïfa left the relegated Corsican team and came back in the Paris region, signing a one-year contract with National club Paris FC.

References

External links
 FootNational Profile

1986 births
Living people
People from Les Ulis
French footballers
UJA Maccabi Paris Métropole players
US Créteil-Lusitanos players
Gazélec Ajaccio players
Paris FC players
USM Alger players
Ligue 2 players
Championnat National players
French sportspeople of Algerian descent
CO Les Ulis players
Sainte-Geneviève Sports players
SR Colmar players
Association football midfielders
Footballers from Essonne